Dexter Grimsley (born November 11, 1970) is an American politician who served as a Democrat in the Alabama House of Representatives from the 85th district from 2010 to 2022, representing Henry and Houston counties.

Grimsley worked as a state probation officer for 19 years, but after being re-elected to a second four-year term as state representative, was told he could not hold two state positions. He has said that he needed to have a second job to support his family financially and was only five years from retirement.

Grimsley served three terms in the state legislature. He was unseated in 2022 when he was defeated in his bid for re-election by Republican candidate Rick Rehm.

References

External links

1970 births
Living people
Democratic Party members of the Alabama House of Representatives
21st-century American politicians
People from Abbeville, Alabama
Northwestern State University alumni
African-American state legislators in Alabama